HP OpenView is the former name for a Hewlett-Packard product family that consisted of network and systems management products. In 2007, HP OpenView was rebranded as HP BTO (Business Technology Optimization) Software when it became part of the HP Software Division. The products are now available as various HP products, marketed through the HP Software Division.

HP OpenView software provided large-scale system and network management of an organization's IT infrastructure. It included optional modules from HP as well as third-party management software, which connected within a common framework and communicated with one another.

History
The foundational OpenView product was Network Node Manager (NNM), network monitoring software based on SNMP. NNM was used to manage networks and could be used in conjunction with other management software, such as CiscoWorks.

In April 2004, HP bought Novadigm and its Radia suite. In December 2005, it acquired Peregrine Systems with its IT asset and service management software and integrated it into HP OpenView. In November 2006, HP completed its purchase of Mercury Interactive Corp., subsequently integrated Mercury application and software life-cycle management products (QualityCenter, LoadRunner/PerformanceCenter, WinRunner/QTP) into the HP Software & Solutions portfolio. In September 2007, HP acquired Opsware.

In early 2007, alongside the integration of Mercury Interactive, Peregrine Systems and Opsware products, HP OpenView products were rebranded under the HP Software Division business, and the OpenView and Mercury names were phased out. The HP OpenCall name continues as part of the HP Software Division business.

Products 
 HP OpenView Network Node Manager (OV NNM)
 HP Operations Manager (OM) — monitor systems and applications using agents
 HP OMW - Operations Manager (Windows) (formerly OVOW, formerly VantagePoint Operations for Windows)
 HP OMU - Operations Manager (Unix) (formerly OVOU, formerly VantagePoint Operations for Unix, sometimes referenced as ITO, formerly Operation Center " OPC")
 HP OpenView ServiceManager (formerly Peregrine ServiceCenter)- now HP Software Service Manager
 HP OpenView AssetManager (formerly Peregrine AssetCenter)
 HP OpenView Connect-It - A data and process integration tool
 HP OpenView Service Desk (OVSD) - migration to HP Software Service Manager is optional
 HP OpenView Internet Services (OVIS) - Discontinued 
 HP OpenView Service Navigator (integrated in HP Operations Manager for Unix since 1996)
 HP OpenView Transaction Analyzer (OVTA) - Discontinued
 HP OpenView SOA Manager
 HP OpenView Select Identity (OVSI) - Discontinued
 HP OpenView Select Access (OVSA) - Discontinued
 HP OpenView Select Audit - Discontinued
 HP OpenView Select Federation - Discontinued
 HP OpenView Service Information Portal - Discontinued
 HP Software Universal CMDB (UCMDB)
 Enterprise Systems Management (ESM)

Performance 
 HP OpenView Performance Agent (OVPA)
 HP OpenView Performance Insight (OVPI)
 HP OpenView Performance Manager (OVPM)
 HP OpenView Reporter (OVR) 2.0, 3.0, 3.5, 3.6 and 3.80
 HP OpenView GlancePlus

Fault/Resource Status Monitoring 
 HP OpenView TeMIP — A Telecoms OSS service (formerly just known as TeMIP when owned by Compaq-Digital Equipment Corporation)

Provisioning/fulfillment 
 HP OpenView Service Activator (OVSA) - rebranded as HP Service Activator (HPSA)

Storage 
 HP Software Storage Essentials
 HP OpenView Storage Data Protector
 HP OpenView Storage Mirroring
 HP OpenView Storage Mirroring Exchange Failover Utility
 HP OpenView Dashboard (formerly Service Information Portal (SIP) — provides a web portal for HP OpenView management products)
 HP OpenView Storage Area Manager (OV SAM) - Discontinued

HP OpenView Smart Plug-ins 
(SPIs) — These are add-ons products for OpenView Operations for additional management capabilities:
 HP OpenView SPI for BEA Tuxedo
 HP OpenView SPI for BEA WebLogic
 HP OpenView SPI for BEA WebLogic Integration
 HP OpenView SPI for BMC CONTROL-M Job Scheduling / Workload Automation Solution 
 HP OpenView SPI for BlackBerry Enterprise Server (BES) 
 HP OpenView SPI for Citrix 
 HP OpenView SPI for Databases (Oracle, Microsoft SQL Server, Sybase, and Informix)
 HP OpenView SPI for Documentum 
 HP OpenView SPI for IBM DB2 
 HP OpenView SPI for IBM WebSphere Application Server
 HP OpenView SPI for Lotus Domino/Notes
 HP OpenView SPI for Microsoft Exchange
 HP OpenView SPI for Microsoft Windows
 HP OpenView SPI for MySQL Databases
 HP OpenView SPI for OpenVMS
 HP OpenView SPI for Oracle Application Server
 HP OpenView SPI for PeopleSoft
 HP OpenView SPI for Remedy ARS Integration
 HP OpenView SPI for SAP
 HP OpenView SPI for Dollar Universe
 HP OpenView SPI for Siebel 
 HP OpenView SPI for HP Service Manager
 HP OpenView SPI for Storage Area Manager
 HP OpenView SPI for Terminal Server 
 HP OpenView SPI for TIBCO
 HP OpenView SPI for UNIX OS
 HP OpenView SPI for Web Servers
 HP OpenView SPI for VMware
 HP OpenView SPI for WebSPOC ITSM Integration

Network Node Manager SPIs
 Network Node Manager for Advanced Routing (for NNM version 7 only)
 Network Node Manager SPI for Quality Assurance (for NNMi version 9 and later)
 Network Node Manager SPI for Traffic (for NNMi version 9 and later)
 Network Node Manager SPI for IP Telephony
 Network Node Manager SPI for LAN/WAN Edge (for NNM version 7 only)
 Network Node Manager SPI for MPLS VPN (for NNMi version 9 and later)
 Network Node Manager SPI for IP Multicast (for NNMi version 9 and later)

HP OpenView Configuration Management 
HP Configuration Management software, formerly Radia from Novadigm, is now part of HP Client Automation Software which is now owned by Accelerite, a product division of Persistent Systems.
The following products were part of the OpenView product set:
 
 HP OpenView Configuration Management Application Self-Service Manager
 HP OpenView Configuration Management Application Manager
 HP OpenView Configuration Management Inventory Manager
 HP OpenView Configuration Management OS Manager
 HP OpenView Configuration Management Patch Manager
 HP OpenView Configuration Management Application Usage Manager
 HP OpenView Client Configuration Manager

IUM
HP OpenView Internet Usage Manager (IUM) provides convergent mediation. It collects, processes and correlates usage records and events from network elements and service applications across voice and data services for prepaid, post-paid and real-time charging in wireless, wireline and cable networks. This usage data can be passed on to business support systems for usage-based billing systems, capacity management and analysis of subscriber behavior.

HP Software Business Availability Center (BAC)
Formerly products from Mercury Interactive and now integrated into the HP portfolio:
 HP Software Business Availability Center / Business Process Monitor (BAC/BPM)
 HP Software Business Availability Center / Real User Management (BAC/RUM)
 HP Software Business Availability Center / System Availability Management (BAC/SAM)
 HP Software Business Availability Center / Diagnostics (BAC/Diags)
 HP Software Business Availability Center / Universal CMDB (BAC/uCMDB)
 HP Software Business Availability Center / Service Level Management (BAC/SLM)
 HP Software Business Availability Center / Problem Isolation (BAC/PI)
 HP Software Business Availability Center / Business Process Insight (BAC/BPI)
 HP Software SiteScope (SiS)

HP Software Data Center Automation (DCA) 
Formerly products from Opsware and now integrated into the HP portfolio:

 HP Software Server Automation (SA) (formerly Opsware Server Automation System (SAS))
 HP Software Storage Essentials (SE) (HP existing product Storage Essentials has been merged with former Opsware Application Storage Automation System (ASAS))
 HP Software Operations Orchestration (OO) (formerly Opsware Process Automation System (PAS) (formerly iConclude Orchestrator ))
 HP Software Network Automation (NA) (formerly Opsware Network Automation System NAS))

User Groups 
The OpenView Forum International was an OpenView user group. It became Vivit (in early 2007) and organized the yearly HP Software Forum. In 2007, HP took over responsibility for the HP Software Forum and renamed it HP Software Universe.

While it is not an actual "user group", the ITRC is an online forum about former OpenView and HP Software products. A new user group, the HP Software Solutions Community, officially launched publicly in April 2010 and includes all former software-related communities.

References

External links 
 HP Software Solutions Community 
 HP Software Universe
 OpenView solution list
 HP OpenView Dashboard Forum
 HP Software User Group
 Partners Building on HP Software Solutions 
 A Collection of White Papers for HP Openview Service Desk and other products

Network management
System administration
OpenView